The 2018–19 Evansville Purple Aces men's basketball team represented the University of Evansville during the 2018–19 NCAA Division I men's basketball season. The Purple Aces, led by first-year head coach Walter McCarty, played their home games at the Ford Center as members of the Missouri Valley Conference. They finished the season 11–21 overall, 5–13 in MVC play, and finishing in last place. As the No. 10 seed in the MVC tournament, they lost to Illinois State in the first round.

Previous season
The Purple Aces finished the 2017–18 season 17–15, 7–11 in MVC play to finish in a three-way tie for seventh place. As the No. 8 seed in the MVC tournament, they lost to Northern Iowa in the first round.

On March 13, 2018, Evansville fired head coach Marty Simmons. He finished at Evansville with an 11-year record of 184–175. On March 22, the school hired Boston Celtics assistant coach, former Kentucky player, and Evansville native Walter McCarty as head coach.

Offseason

Departures

Incoming transfers

2018 recruiting class

2019 recruiting class

Roster

Schedule and results

|-
!colspan=9 style=| Exhibition

|-
!colspan=9 style=| Non-conference regular season

|-
!colspan=9 style=| Missouri Valley regular season

|-
!colspan=9 style=| Missouri Valley tournament

Source

References

Evansville Purple Aces men's basketball seasons
Evansville
Evansville
Evansville